Iodine nitrate is a chemical with formula INO3. It is a covalent molecule with a structure of I–O–NO2.

Preparation

The compound was first produced by the reaction of mercury(II) nitrate and iodine in ether.

Other nitrate salts and solvents can also be used.

As a gas it is slightly unstable, decaying with a rate constant of −3.2×10−2 s−1. The possible formation of this chemical in the atmosphere and its ability to destroy ozone have been studied. Potential reactions in this context are:
IONO2 → IO + NO2
IONO2 → I + NO3 
I + O3 → IO + O2

References

Nitrates
Iodine compounds